Puffing may refer to:

 Tobacco smoking
 Puffing grain, a process used in cereal manufacturing
 Puffery, a legal term referring to promotional statements
 Solar puffing, the act of using a magnifying lens to heat cannabis for consumption

See also
 Puff (disambiguation)